Hedwige (Gennaro)-Chrétien (15 July 1859 – 1944) was a French composer.

Life
Born in Compiègne, Chrétien was appointed professor at the Paris Conservatoire in 1889 where she had previously been a student from 1874, studying with Ernest Guiraud. In 1881, she won  first prize in harmony, counterpoint and fugue. She also won first prize in piano and in composition in other concours, which she entered. She was a prolific composer, yet not much else is known about her life. Her compositions, about 150 in all, consist of  pieces for piano, orchestral and chamber works, songs,  two ballets  and two one-act operas.

One of the most extensive collections of her work in the United States is held in the University of Michigan's Women Composers Collection, which is available on microfilm from there and other libraries.

Selected works

Ballets
 Ballet orientale, ballet
 La Valée des sphinx, ballet in two acts

Chamber works
 Berceuse (violin)
 Grand solo (Andante et Allegro) (1886) (trombone)
 In memoriam (1934) (violoncello and organ)
 Lied 'Soir d'Automne''' (cello and piano)
 Poème lyrique (1886) (competitive examination winner for Société des compositeurs de musique)
 Quintette (Arabesque et Sarabande) (flute, oboe, clarinet, bassoon, horn and piano)
 Serenade sous bois (trio for flute, oboe and piano)
 Trio pour violon, violoncello and piano (Allegro con fuoco, Andante expressivo, Scherzo)
Choral
 Les Ailes du rêve! L'Angelus Août, words by Horace Hennion from Mois, Mixed choir SATB
 Ballade L'Été La Madone des champs (3 voices)
 Les Matelots Le Moulin Nos Soldats, scène lyrique, bass and tenor soloists and choir SATB, with orchestra
 Pensée fugitive Sur la Falaise, words by Paul Bourget, children's choir SA
Opera
 La Cinquantaine, opérette pour jeunes filles
 Menuet de l'Impératrice, opérette pour jeunes filles
Orchestral
 Belle époque (1887) (chamber orchestra)
 Danse Rustique (orchestral)
 L'Escarpolette, waltz for orchestra
 Fleur de Lande, ronde Bretonne (orchestral)
 Pastels (orchestral)
Organ and/or harmonium 
 Cinq pièces brèves (organ)
 Harmonies religieuses (organ or harmonium)
 Marche funèbre (organ)
Organ with other instruments
 In memoriam (1934) (violoncello and organ)
Piano
 Ariel caprice fantastique
 Au village. Le moulin, scènes pastorales Chansons du rouet En cheminant, ritournelle pour piano
 Farandole Fleur de landes, ronde bretonne
 Naïades Les Papillons, valse de salon
 Polichinelles roses Pour endormir Yvonne,  berceuse (lullaby) by H. Pommier arranged for piano by Hedwige Chrétien.
 Qui vive!?, morceau de genre
 Rataboul (1905) (polka for piano)
 Romance sans paroles Scherzo-valse La Source Speranza, valse lente
 Tarentelle, pour piano à 4 mains, piano four hands
 Trilby Valse berceuse Valse-caprice Valse des libellules Sonatines
 No.1: Pastorale No.2: Dès l'Aurore No.3:  Joyeuse NouvelleVocal(All compositions are for voice and piano unless otherwise noted.) Aubade,   words by  P. Ladoué
 Aube aux Champs words by Léo Marcel
 Baiser errants,  words by L. Fortolis
 Ballade, de s'amye bien belle, words by Clément Marot (1527)
 Bébés et grand'mamans Bien-Aimés, words by Charles Giugno
 Canzonetta, words by Pierre Ladoué
 Caprice de troubadour, words by Gaston Petit
 C'est si peu de chose
 Chanson des pêcheurs de lune, Barcarolle à deux voix (duet), words by L. Fortolis
 Chanson pur la Bien-Aimée, words by Charles Fuster
 Chant d'amour
 Dernier rêve!, words by L. Fortolis
 Duetto-Barcarolle, words by Eduard Guinand
 Feux follets, words by L. Fortolis
 La chanson bénie, words by Léon Dierx
 La Jeanneton, words by J. Lafforgue
 La Nuit, words by R. Elgé, two voices, violin and piano
 La Vieille fontaine, words by Pierre Alin
 Là-bas!, chanson Bohémienne, words by Léo Marcel
 Le Calme, words by A. Dorchain, Voice, piano and violin obligato
 Le Cavalier, words by Léo Marcel (Légende fantastique)
 Le coeur de mira, extrait des chansons moraves, words by L. Fortolis
  Le Cor, words by Alfred de Vigny
 Le Rouet sur le clavecin, words by Raymond Philippon
 Les Ailes du Rêve, words by Charles Fuster
 Les rêves, words by A. Dréville
 L'Étoile, with piano and violin
 Lumière de l'âme, words by Madame Galeron de Calonne
 Mademoiselle bébé, à grand-papa, words by J. Morin
 Mirage-Habanera, words by Eduard Guinand
 Mon Ruisseau, poésie de J. Lafforgue
 Musique au bord de la Mer, poésie de Dorchais, adaption with violin
 Noël naïf
 Point d'orgue du menuet,  inspired by a painting by Watteau, words by Léo Marcel
 Pour ceux qui aiment, words by Aymé Magnien, Voice, piano and violin obligato
 Pour nos soldats, prière. words and music by Hedwige Chrétien
 Prière, words by Lamartine, with violin
 Prismes lunaires, words by L. Fortolis,
 Quand tu pleureras , words by Léo Marcel
 Que je t'oublie!? (1897), words by Léo Marcel
 Reliques, words by J. Lafforgue
 Ronde champêtre
 Ronde d'amour, words by Jules Lafforgue
 Silhouettes fantasques/Clair de lune, words by Marguerite Bracks
 Sur la route d'Alcala, Voice and orchestra
 Votre sourire, words by Eva Jouan

Recordings
 Quintette on Casino Belle Epoque played by Le Concert Impromptu, Verany-Arion/Abeille musique PV 796044 (1996)
 Vision played by Gaston Crunelle (flute) and Lucien Petitjean (piano); Gramophone K6999 (recorded 1933)

Media

Que je t'oublie?

References

External links
 
 Hedwige Chretien. ‘Musette’ (1944). Andrew Pink (2022) 'Exordia ad missam'.

1859 births
1944 deaths
20th-century classical composers
20th-century French composers
20th-century French women musicians
Academic staff of the Conservatoire de Paris
Conservatoire de Paris alumni
French women classical composers
French Romantic composers
People from Compiègne
Women music educators
20th-century women composers
19th-century women composers
Composers for pipe organ